The term Kaiserpfalz ("imperial palace") or Königspfalz ("royal palace", from Middle High German phal[en]ze to Old High German phalanza from Middle Latin palatia [plural] to Latin palatium "palace") refers to a number of castles and palaces across the Holy Roman Empire that served as temporary, secondary seats of power for the Holy Roman Emperor in the Early and High Middle Ages. The term was also used more rarely for a bishop who, as a territorial lord (Landesherr), had to provide the king and his entourage with board and lodging, a duty referred to as Gastungspflicht.

Origin of the name 
Kaiserpfalz is a German word that is a combination of Kaiser, meaning "emperor", which is derived from "caesar"; and Pfalz, meaning "palace", and itself derived from the Latin palatium, meaning the same (see palace). Likewise Königspfalz is a combination of König, "king", and Pfalz, meaning "royal palace".

Description and purpose 

Like their peers in France and England, the medieval emperors of the Holy Roman Empire did not rule from a capital city, but had to maintain personal contact with their vassals on the ground. This was so-called "itinerant kingship"; a sort of "travelling kingdom" (Reisekönigtum).

Because pfalzen were built and used by the king as a ruler within the Holy Roman Empire  (rex Romanorum (Römischer König)), the correct historical term is Königspfalz or "royal palace". The term Kaiserpfalz is a 19th-century appellation that overlooks the fact that the king did not bear the title of the Roman Emperor (granted by the Pope) until after his imperial coronation. Unlike a pfalz, where the itinerant ruler enacted his sovereign duties, a royal estate or Königshof is only an economic estate owned by the king, which was only occasionally used by the king on his itinerary.

Unlike the common notion of "palace", a pfalz was not a permanent residence but a place where the emperor stayed for a certain time, usually less than a year; itineraries suggest that the monarch rarely would stay for longer than a few weeks. Moreover, they were not always grand palaces in the accepted sense: some were small castles or fortified hunting lodges, such as Bodfeld in the Harz.

But in the main they were large manor houses (Gutshöfe), that offered catering and accommodation for the king and his many retainers, often running to hundreds of staff, as well as numerous guests and their horses. In Latin, such a royal manor was known as a villa regia or curtis regia. They were located either near the bishop's residences, near important abbeys, near towns the king held or in the countryside in the middle of royal estates. Pfalzen were generally built at intervals of 30 kilometres, which represented a day's journey by horse at that time.

At a minimum, a pfalz consisted of a palas with its Great Hall or Aula Regia, an imperial chapel (Pfalzkapelle) and an  estate (Gutshof). It was here that kings and emperors carried out the business of state, held their imperial court sessions and celebrated important church festivals. Each was administered by a count palatine, who executed jurisdiction in the emperor's stead. One of the most important of them would eventually rise to the title of Prince-elector.

The pfalzen that the rulers visited varied depending on their function. Especially important were those palaces in which the kings spent the winter (winter palaces or Winterpfalzen), and the festival palaces (Festtagspfalzen), Easter being the most important and celebrated at Easter palaces (Osterpfalzen).  The larger palaces were often in towns that had special rights (e.g. imperial immediacy), but could also be bishop's seats or imperial abbeys.

In the Hohenstaufen era of the Roman-German kingdom, important imperial princes began to demonstrate their claims to power by building their own pfalzen. Important examples of these include Henry the Lion's Dankwarderode Castle in Brunswick and the Wartburg above Eisenach in Thuringia. Both buildings followed the basic design of Hohenstaufen pfalzen and also had the same dimensions.

List of Holy Roman Imperial palaces 

Examples of surviving imperial palaces may be found in the town of Goslar and at Düsseldorf-Kaiserswerth.

 Aachen
 Adelberg
 Aibling
 Albisheim
 Altenburg
 Altötting
 Alzey
 Amorbach
 Andernach
 Ansbach
 Arneburg
 Arnstadt
 Aufhausen
 Augsburg
 Baden-Baden
 Balgstädt
 Bamberg
 Bardowick
 Batzenhofen
 Belgern
 Beratzhausen
 Berstadt
 Biebrich
 Bierstadt
 Bingen am Rhein
 Böckelheim
 Bodfeld
 Bodman
 Bonn
 Boppard
 Boyneburg
 Brandenburg
 Braunschweig
 Breisach
 Breitenbach
 Breitingen
 Bremen
 Bruchsal
 Brüggen
 Bürgel
 Bürstadt
 Buxtehude
 Calbe
 Cham
 Cochem
 Corvey
 Dahlen
 Derenburg
  Diedenhofen
 Dollendorf
 Donaueschingen
 Donaustauf
 Donauwörth
 Dornburg
 Dortmund
 Duisburg
 Düren
 Durlach
 Ebersberg
 Ebrach
 Ebsdorf
 Eckartsberga
 Eger
 Eichstätt
 Eisenberg
 Eisfeld
 Eisleben
 Elten
 Eresburg
 Erfurt
 Ermschwerd
 Erwitte
 Eschwege
 Essen
 Esslingen am Neckar
 Ettenstatt
 Etterzhausen
 Eußerthal
 Flamersheim
 Forchheim
 Frankfurt am Main
 Freiburg im Breisgau
 Freising
 Fritzlar
 Frohse an der Elbe
 Fulda
 Fürth
 Gandersheim
 Gebesee
 Gehren
 Geldersheim
 Gelnhausen
 Germersheim
 Gernrode
 Gernsheim
 Gerstungen
 Giebichenstein
 Gieboldehausen
 Giengen
 Göppingen
 Goslar
 Gottern
 Grebenau
 Grone
 Großseelheim
 Günzburg
 Gustedt
 Hahnbach an der Vils
 Haina
 Halberstadt
 Halle
 Hammerstein
 Harsefeld
 Harzburg
 Haselbach
 Hasselfelde
 Haßloch
 Havelberg
 Heidingsfeld
 Heilbronn
 Heiligenberg
 Heiligenstadt
 Heimsheim
 Helfta
 Helmstedt
 Hemau
 Herbrechtingen
 Herford
 Herrenbreitungen
 Hersfeld
 Herstelle
 Herzberg
 Heßloch
 Hildesheim
 Hilwartshausen
 Hirsau
 Hirschaid
 Hohenaltheim
 Hohenstaufen
 Hohentwiel
 Hohnstedt
 Hollenstedt
 Hornburg
 Ilsenburg
 Imbshausen
 Ingelheim
 Ingolstadt
 Inning
 Kaiserslautern
 Kaiserswerth
 Kamba
 Kassel
 Kastel
 Kaufungen
 Kayna
 Kelheim
 Kelsterbach
 Kessel
 Kirchberg
 Kirchen
 Kirchohsen
 Kissenbrück
 Kissingen
 Kitzingen
 Koblenz
 Köln
 Komburg
 Königsdahlum
 Königslutter
 Konstanz
 Kostheim
 Kraisdorf
 Kreuznach
 Ladenburg
 Lampertheim
 Langen
 Langenau
 Langenzenn
 Laufen
 Lauffen am Neckar
 Lautertal (Oberfranken)
 Leisnig
 Leitzkau
 Lichtenberg
 Limburg an der Haardt
 Lingen
 Lippeham
 Lippspringe
 Lonnerstadt
 Lonsheim
 Lorch
 Lorsch
 Lustenau
 Lügde
 Lüneburg
 Magdeburg
 Mainz
 Markgröningen
 Mecklenburg
 Meißen
 Memleben
 Memmingen
 Mengen
 Mering
 Merseburg
 Minden
 Mindersdorf
 Mirsdorf
 Mögeldorf
 Moosburg
 Mörfelden
 Mosbach
 Mötsch
 Mühlhausen
 Münden
 Münnerstadt
 Münster
 Münstereifel
 Nabburg
 Nanstein
 Nattheim
 Naumburg
 Neuburg
 Neudingen
 Neuenburg Castle (Freyburg)
 Neuhausen
 Neuss
 Niederalteich
 Nienburg
 Nierstein
 Nijmegen
 Nordhausen
 Northeim
 Nürnberg
 Nußdorf
 Obertheres
 Ochsenfurt
 Oferdingen
 Ohrdruf
 Ohrum
 Oppenheim
 Oschersleben
 Osnabrück
 Osterhausen
 Osterhofen
 Osterode
 Paderborn
 Passau
 Pegau
 Peiting
 Pforzheim
 Pöhlde
 Pondorf
 Prüm
 Quedlinburg
 Ramspau
 Rasdorf
 Regensburg
 Rehme
 Reibersdorf
 Reichenau
 Rheinbach
 Riekofen
 Ritteburg
 Rochlitz
 Rodach
 Roding
 Rohr
 Rommelhausen
 Rösebeck
 Rosenburg
 Rothenburg ob der Tauber
 Rottweil
 Rüdesheim
 Rülzheim
 Saalfeld
 Säckingen
 Salz
 Salzwedel
 Samswegen
 Sankt Goar
 Sasbach am Kaiserstuhl
 Schattbuch
 Schienen
 Schierling
 Schöningen
 Schüller
 Schwäbisch Gmünd
 Schwäbisch Hall
 Schwarzenbruck
 Schwarzrheindorf
 See, Gem. Lupburg
 Seehausen
 Seidmannsdorf
 Seinstedt
 Seligenstadt
 Sinzig
 Siptenfelde
 Soest
 Sohlingen
 Sömmeringen
 Sontheim an der Brenz
 Speyer
 Stadtamhof
 Staffelsee
 Stallbaum
 Steele
 Stegaurach
 Tangermünde
 Tauberbischofsheim
 Tennstedt
 Thangelstedt
 Thingau
 Thorr
 Thüngen
 Tilleda
 Treben
 Trebur
 Treis
 Trier
 Trifels
 Überlingen
 Ulm
 Vaihingen an der Enz
 Velden
 Verden
 Vilich
 Villmar
 Vlatten
 Völklingen
 Vreden
 Wadgassen
 Wahren
 Waiblingen
 Walbeck
 Waldsassen
 Walldorf
 Wallhausen
 Wallhausen
 Wechmar
 Weilburg
 Weinheim
 Weinsberg
 Weisenau
 Weißenburg
 Werben
 Werden
 Werla
 Wiedenbrück
 Wiehe
 Wiesbaden
 Wiesloch
 Wildeshausen
 Wimpfen
 Winterbach
 Wölfis
 Worms
 Würzburg
 Wurzen
 Xanten
 Zeitz
 Zülpich
 Zusmarshausen
 Zutphen

See also 
 Palace
 Palas
 Imperial castle (Reichsburg)

References

Literature 
 Adolf Eggers: Der königliche Grundbesitz im 10. und beginnenden 11. Jahrhundert, H. Böhlaus Nachfolger, 1909
 Lutz Fenske: Deutsche Königspfalzen: Beiträge zu ihrer historischen und archäologischen Erforschung, Zentren herrschaftlicher Repräsentation im Hochmittelalter: Geschichte Architektur und Zeremoniell, by the Max Planck Institute of History, Vandenhoeck & Ruprecht, 1963, 9783525365212
 Paul Grimm: Stand und Aufgaben des archäologischen Pfalzenforschung in den Bezirken Halle und Magdeburg, Akademie-Verlag, 1961
 Günther Binding: Deutsche Königspfalzen, Von Karl dem Großen bis Friedrich II. (765–1240). Darmstadt, 1996, .
 Alexander Thon: Barbarossaburg, Kaiserpfalz, Königspfalz oder Casimirschloss? Studien zu Relevanz und Gültigkeit des Begriffes „Pfalz“ im Hochmittelalter anhand des Beispiels (Kaisers-)Lautern. In: Kaiserslauterer Jahrbuch für pfälzische Geschichte und Volkskunde. Kaiserslautern, 1.2001, pp. 109–144.
 Alexander Thon: ... ut nostrum regale palatium infra civitatem vel in burgo eorum non hedificent. Studies of relevance and validity to do with the term "Pfalz" for the research of castles of the 12th and 13th centuries in: Burgenbau im 13. Jahrhundert. pub. by the Wartburg-Gesellschaft for the research of castles and palaces along with the Germanic National Museum. Research into castles and palaces. Vol. 7. Deutscher Kunstverlag, Munich, 2002, pp. 45–72.
 Gerhard Streich: Burg und Kirche während des deutschen Mittelalters. Untersuchungen zur Sakraltopographie von Pfalzen, Burgen und Herrensitzen, 2 Vols., published by the Constance Working Group for Medieval History, Thorbecke-Verlag, 1984, .

 
Monarchy of the Holy Roman Empire
Castles in Germany
Palaces in Germany